Evergreen Memorial Cemetery is a primarily African American cemetery in Miami, Florida. It opened in 1913. The owners of the Miami Times eventually bought it. Five African American police officers are buried at it, including one of the city's first. Lincoln Memorial Park, opened in 1924, is another cemetery for African Americans several blocks away and has gravesites like that of J. A. Dorsey, a philanthropist and Miami's first African American millionaire. Evergreen is one of the oldest cemeteries for African Americans in Miami-Dade County. Most of the deceased are in above-ground vaults.

References

African-American cemeteries in Florida